Anagrus incarnatus is a species of fairyfly. It is an egg parasitoid of Cicadella viridis, several genera and species of Delphacidae (Hemiptera), and also Orthotylus virescens. It's native to the Palearctic.

References

Mymaridae
Insects described in 1833
Palearctic insects